The 1884 United States presidential election in Vermont took place on November 4, 1884, as part of the 1884 United States presidential election. Voters chose four representatives, or electors to the Electoral College, who voted for president and vice president.

Vermont voted for the Republican nominee, James G. Blaine, over the Democratic nominee, Grover Cleveland. Blaine won the Green Mountain State by a margin of 37.34%.

With 66.52% of the popular vote, Vermont would be Blaine's strongest victory in terms of percentage in the popular vote.

Results

Results by county

See also
 United States presidential elections in Vermont

References

Vermont
1884
1884 Vermont elections